Elizabeth Evelyn Wright (April 3, 1872 – December 14, 1906) founded Denmark Industrial Institute in Denmark, South Carolina, as a school for African-American youth.  It is present-day Voorhees College, a historically black college (HBCU).  She was a humanitarian and educator, founding several schools for black children.

Early life and education
Wright was born on April 3, 1872 in rural Talbotton, Georgia.  Her father, John Wesley Wright, was an African-American carpenter.  Her mother, Virginia Rolfe, was a Cherokee woman.  Wright went to a school held in a church basement.

In 1888, she matriculated at Booker T. Washington's Tuskegee Institute as a night student. After two years, Wright moved to Hampton County, South Carolina to assist in a rural school for black children. After the school was burned, she returned to Tuskegee and graduated.

Career
Inspired by her experience at Tuskegee and knowing the importance of education, Wright started several schools in the area of Denmark, but they failed due to arson, jealousy, or other reasons.  Wright started a night school for African-American men in Hampton County.

In 1897, she moved to Denmark in rural Bamberg County, South Carolina.  There she started a school over a store with the support of some influential people in the community.  She raised money for what she called Denmark Industrial School, modeled after Tuskegee Institute.

Ralph Voorhees and his wife, philanthropists from Clinton, New Jersey, donated $5,000 for the purchase of land and construction of the school's first building.  In 1902 Voorhees Industrial School opened for male and female students at the elementary and high school levels, and Wright was principal.  Voorhees provided additional gifts during the next few years, and the General Assembly incorporated the school in his name.

For years this was the only high school for blacks in the area.

The school was later affiliated with the Protestant Episcopal Church and eventually became a fully accredited four-year college.

Marriage
In 1906 Wright married Martin A. Menafee, treasurer of Voorhees College.  Shortly after her marriage, she became ill. She went to the well-known Battle Creek Sanitarium in Michigan for medical treatment but died there on December 14, 1906.

Wright was buried on the Voorhees College campus.

References

External links
 Voorhees College web page on Elizabeth Evelyn Wright

1872 births
1909 deaths
People from Talbotton, Georgia
Tuskegee University alumni
American people of Cherokee descent
African-American history of South Carolina
People from Hampton County, South Carolina
People from Denmark, South Carolina
19th-century Native Americans